Jorge Blanco (born March 21, 1945 in Caracas) is a Venezuelan-born American artist, who emigrated to the United States in 1999. He has spent his professional career working as a sculptor, graphic designer and illustrator. His work is in public sites in the United States, South America and Japan.
Blanco is an international artist who has created a sculptural language over more than thirty years. Blanco has placed 25 public art sculptures in large format across the globe.
In addition to public art, Blanco continues his life trajectory with collectible sculptures, his comic strip "The Castaway," and furniture design. His artworks form part of sales in auction houses such as Sotheby's and Christie's.
In 1971, Blanco graduated as an industrial designer from the Neumann Institute of Design in Caracas, Venezuela. Under the mentorship of European artists living as expatriates in Caracas, Blanco learned to integrate industrial design with creative processes. His instructors were predominantly artists, such as Gego and Cornelis Zitman, who emphasized artistry in their classrooms. Blanco graduated with a degree in industrial design upon the completion of his first furniture line for children, which was a thesis project.
Immediately after graduation Blanco began his career as a sculptor, freelance graphic designer and furniture designer. In the late 70s he studied at Rome's Academy of Fine Arts. During his stay in Europe Blanco also uncovered the world of cartoonists. This discovery led Blanco to create the comic strip, "The Castaway."
In 1980, "The Castaway" made its debut in El Diario de Caracas. T Castaway was widely disseminated across the city, including the city's metro system. Eight books have been published on Blanco's "The Castaway."
As "The Castaway" continued to live its success, Blanco illustrated more than twenty storybooks for children and countless educational books. His accomplishments as illustrator led him to El Museo de los Niños, where he served as Creative Director for twenty years.Like the work of his primary influences, Klee, Miró, Herbin and Calder, Blanco's presents his sculptures in primary colors.
Blanco's largest body of work has been created and fabricated in the United States, where he lives and works since 1999. His artwork has received multiple accolades.

Education
Blanco began drawing and painting in 1967 and sculpting in the early 1970s, although he was interested in art from an early age. He received his formal training at the Neumann Institute in Caracas, Venezuela, which he attended with the aid of a scholarship. He graduated in 1971 with a degree in Industrial Design, after which he worked as a graphic designer. From 1975 to 1979, he lived in Rome, Italy, where he attended open classes at the Academy of Fine Arts.

Career
Blanco's first solo exhibition was in 1974, where he showed sculpture and drawings. A year later, he moved to Rome, Italy, where he continued to work in sculpture while making a living by doing freelance graphic design drawing cartoons for a variety of newspapers and magazines, including political cartoons for the newspaper L'Opinione. It was during this period that he first conceived the idea of a comic strip.

In 1978, Blanco participated in the Bordhigera Humor Salon, winning the Dattero D'Argento, and in the Monterotondo Sculpture Salon, where he was awarded the first prize for medium format sculpture.

In 1979, Blanco returned to Caracas, Venezuela where he exhibited his sculptures and drawings at the Sofía Imber Museum of Contemporary Art. Here, he continued working in sculpture but he also designed and illustrated a children's newspaper El Cohete.

In 1980, he was hired as the Art Director for the Caracas Children's Museum (Art, Science and Technology, Museo de los Niños)  (1980–1998). He worked there for 18 years.

That same year, Blanco created the comic strip The Castaway/El Náufrago, which became an overnight success. It was published in major newspapers and magazines in Venezuela and lead to significant sales in merchandising and books. The Castaway even crossed over to television. Due to the comic's success, Blanco no longer had time to work on his sculpture alongside his work as freelance graphic designer, illustrator, and his job at the museum, and had to put sculpture aside.

In 1989, Blanco returned to sculpture, and eventually left the Caracas Children's Museum to  move to the United States, where he still lives today. Blanco began exhibiting again in both Venezuela and the United States as well as around the world. In 1996, Blanco installed four sculptures in Tokyo, Japan, which launched his fascination with public art.

Since 1999, Blanco has lived and worked on the West Coast of Florida, with a particular focus on public art. In 2005, Blanco became an American citizen. He currently resides in Sarasota, Florida.

In 2007, Blanco received the John Ringling Visual Art Award.

The Castaway (El Naufrago)
The Castaway is a comic strip created by Blanco in 1980 about a man trapped on an island that was originally printed in the newspaper El Diario de Caracas. The strip was wildly popular, and images from it have been featured on the covers of notebooks, phone cards, and T-shirts.
"The Castaway" was also published in the United States in The Observer a Sarasota-based weekly newspaper.

Influences
Blanco's early works were influenced by his teachers Gertrude Goldschmidt (Gego) and Cornelis Zitman and by the work of artists such as Auguste Herbin, Paul Klee and Joan Miró. At this time, he worked with  materials such as Lycra, rope, wood, mirrors, and bronze. In 1992, Blanco began to explore color and metal as a primary material.

Public art
 "Go Bongo", Ghent Station, Norfolk, Virginia, USA
 "Swimming in Jupiter", Town of Jupiter, Florida, USA
 "AIR" , MARC athletic Center, Park City, Utah, USA
 Breakaway, Renown Health Center, Reno, Nevada, USA
 Yellow Thinker, Renown Health Center. Reno, Nevada, USA
 El Camarada, José Ignacio, Punta del Este, Uruguay
 Freeriding, Jack Harris Park, North Central College, Michigan, USA 
 Dynamics, Fort Pierce, Florida, USA   
 For The Goal, Leawood Park, Kansas, USA  
 Red Run Red, Leawood Park, Kansas, USA  
 In The Swim, Marina Plaza, Fort Pierce, Florida, USA  
 Andalucia, Riverside Commerce Park, Palm Beach Gardens, Florida, USA 
 Alfresco, University Ridge Park, Reno, Nevada, USA 
 Smile, Boulevard of the Arts, Sarasota, Florida, USA 
 Pleasant Tree, Chula Vista Public Library, California, USA 
 Phoenix, Anderson Administration Building, Venice, Florida, USA 
 To Be Red, Longboat Key Center for the Arts, Sarasota, Florida, USA 
 Cartwheel, Public Arts in Public Schools Project, Sarasota, Florida, USA
 The Runners, Sarasota, Florida, USA
 Maratón, Caracas, Venezuela 
 Nagayama Plaza, group of three sculptures, Tokyo, Japan
 Sun Smile, Azabu Juban, Minato Ku, Tokyo, Japan

Exhibits

Solo exhibitions
 2014/15 "The Joy of Living" O. Ascanio Gallery, Miami, Florida, USA
 2012 "Art Nocturne" Sculpture. Knokke-Heist, Belgium
 2010 "De Punta en Blanco" Sculpture. Espacio Tierra Negra Gallery. José Ignacio, Uruguay
 2009 "New Sculptures" One-man exhibition. HW Gallery. Naples, Florida, USA
 1997 "Metálicas de Vida Alegre" Sculptures & Serigraphs. Icono Gallery. Caracas, Venezuela
 1995 "Humor de Acero" Sculptures. Centro de Arte Euroamericano. Caracas, Venezuela
 1992 "Caras y una Patilla" Sculpture. Galería Oscar Ascanio. Caracas, Venezuela
 1979 "Esculturas y Dibujos" Museo de Arte Contemporáneo de Caracas. Caracas, Venezuela
 1978 "Scultura e Disegni" Istituto Italo-Latino Americano. Roma, Italia
 1976 "Disegni" Paesi Nuovi Gallery. Roma, Italia
 1974  "30 Dibujos" Galería Banap. Caracas, Venezuela

Selected group exhibitions
2015 "Contemporary Expressions & Recent Sculptures by Jorge Blanco"  O. Ascanio Gallery, Miami, Florida, USA
2015 "The Lightness of Being: Abstracts: Part I" Allyn Gallup Contemporary Art, Sarasota, Florida, USA
2015 "Fluid Formalism: Concepts in Motion" O. Ascanio Gallery, Miami, Florida, USA
2014 "Pinta Art Fair" O. Ascanio Gallery, Miami, Florida, USA
2014 "Made in Sarasota", Allyn Gallup Contemporary Art, Sarasota, Florida, USA
2013 "Movement Through Colors", O. Ascanio Gallery, Miami, Florida, USA
2013 "Black, White & Red" A New Leaf Gallery/Sculpturesite, Sonoma, California, USA
2012  "Aesthetic Perfection" O. Ascanio Gallery, Miami, Florida, USA
2012 "Scope Miami" Miami, Florida, USA
2012  "Small-format Sculpture" Galerie Artelie. Paris, France	
2012 "Sculpture" Cafmeyer Gallery. Knokke-Heist, Belgium
2012 "Florida Outdoor Sculpture Competition" Polk Museum of Art + City of Winter Haven. Winter Haven, Florida, USA
2011 "Burst Art Fair" Miami, Florida, USA
2011 "Public Art Exhibition" Coastal Discovery Museum. Hilton Head Island, South Carolina, USA	
2010 "WOW 3" Large-scale Sculpture Exhibition. Fort Pierce, Florida, USA
2008 "Cedarhurst Biennale" Cedarhurst Center for the Arts. Mt. Vernon, Illinois, USA	
2008 "Third Beijing International Art Biennale" National Art Museum of China, Beijing, China 
2008 "WOW 2" Large-scale Sculpture Exhibition. Fort Pierce, Florida, USA
2008 "Where the Wild Things (still) are" The Art Gallery at Florida Gulf Coast University. Fort Myers, Florida
2007 "Sarasota Season of Sculpture 4" Large-scale exhibition. Sarasota, Florida, USA
2007 "Sculpture in the Plaza" Sculpturesite Gallery.  San Francisco, California, USA
2006 "Figuratively Speaking Exhibition" Large-scale sculpture. Stamford, Connecticut, USA
2006 "Primary Colors" Sculpturesite Gallery. San Francisco, California, USA
2006 "Sarasota Season of Sculpture Exhibition." Sarasota, Florida, USA
2005 "Grand Opening Exhibition"  Sculpturesite Gallery. San Francisco, California, USA
2005"New Works" A New Leaf Gallery-Sculpture Site. Berkeley, California, USA
2004 "Sculpture" Fenn Gallery. Woodbury, Connecticut, USA
2004 "Sculpture" A New Leaf Gallery. Berkeley, California, USA
2004 "ArteAmericas" Miami, Florida, USA
2004 "Sculpture" Longboat Key Center for the Arts.  Longboat Key, Florida, USA
2004 "Urban Trees" Port of San Diego. California, USA
2004 "Sarasota Season of Sculpture" Sarasota, Florida, USA
2003 "Hispanic Artists" City of Aventura Government Building. Aventura, Florida, USA
2003 "Sculpture" Katherine Butler Gallery. Sarasota, Florida, USA
2001 "Pier Walk Exhibition" Navy Pier. Chicago, Illinois, USA
1999 "Biennale Internazionale dell'Arte Contemporanea" Firenze, Italia
1998 "Fundraising Gala" John & Mable Ringling Museum of Art. Sarasota, Florida, USA
1998 "Sculpture" Galleria Silecchia. Sarasota, Florida, USA
1997 "Una Tonelada de Arte" Sculpture. Miami Beach, Florida, USA
1997 "Sculpture," Virginia Miller Gallery. Coral Gables, Florida, USA
1996 "Esculturas" Galería Ardentía. Porlamar, Venezuela
1993 "Coca-Cola, 50 años con el Arte" Galería Oscar Ascanio. Caracas, Venezuela
1993 "Primer Festival de Esculturas" Centro Cultural Consolidado. Caracas, Venezuela
1987 "Primer Festival de Arte Venezolano" Galería Oscar Ascanio. Caracas, Venezuela
1981 "Primera Bienal de Artes Visuales" Museo de Bellas Artes, Caracas, Venezuela
1980 "Esculturas" Galería Terracota. Caracas, Venezuela
1979 "XVIII Premio Internacional de Dibujo Joan Miro" Barcelona, España
1979 "Dibujos" Concejo Municipal del Distrito Federal. Caracas, Venezuela
1979 "XXXVII Salon Arturo Michelena" Ateneo de Valencia. Venezuela
1979 "XVII Premio Salón Internacional de Dibujo Joan Miro" Barcelona, España
1979 "Primer Salón de Dibujo Nuevo" Banco Central de Venezuela. Caracas, Venezuela
1978 "III Salón Internacional de Escultura, Pintura y Gráfica" Torre D'Ansperto, Milano, Italia
1977 "Mostra di Artisti Latinoamericani a Roma" Galleria San Marco, Roma, Italia
1977 "XVI Premio Internacional de Dibujo Joan Miro" Barcelona, España
1977 "Nuevas Proposiciones" Casa Bello. Caracas, Venezuela
1977 "Muestra de Dibujos" Sala de la Cultura. Diputación de Navarra, Pamplona, España
1975 "XXXIII Salón Arturo Michelena" Ateneo de Valencia, Venezuela
1975 "Primer Encuentro de Jóvenes Artistas" Casa de la Cultura. Maracay, Venezuela
1975 "IV Salón Nacional de Jóvenes Artistas" INCIBA. Caracas, Venezuela
1975 "Plástica Jóven" Instituto Venezolano del Petróleo. Caracas, Venezuela     
1975 "Primer Salón de Dibujo, Grabado y Diseño Gráfico". Universidad de los Andes. Mérida, Venezuela
1975 "II Salón Nacional de Escultura" Universidad de Carabobo. Valencia, Venezuela
1975 "Varias Visiones" Galería G. Caracas, Venezuela
1974 "XXXII Salon Arturo Michelena" Ateneo de Valencia. Valencia, Venezuela
1973 "III Salón Nacional de Jóvenes Artistas" INCIBA. Caracas, Venezuela
1973"Primer Salón de Arte Centro Plaza" Caracas, Venezuela
1971 "Gráfica Joven" Galería de Arte y Grabado. Caracas, Venezuela

References

Sources
 Jorge Blanco official webpage
 Sculpture Site: Jorge Blanco

1945 births
Living people
People from Caracas
Venezuelan emigrants to the United States
Venezuelan sculptors
Venezuelan comics artists
Venezuelan graphic designers
American sculptors